An endangered language is a language that it is at risk of falling out of use, generally because it has few surviving speakers. If it loses all of its native speakers, it becomes an extinct language. UNESCO defines four levels of language endangerment between "safe" (not endangered) and "extinct":
 Vulnerable
 Definitely endangered
 Severely endangered
 Critically endangered

Languages

See also 
Lists of endangered languages
Red Book of Endangered Languages
Affirmative action in China

References 

China
Human rights of ethnic minorities in China
Separatism in China